The General Staff of the Armed Forces of Ukraine is the military staff of the Armed Forces of Ukraine. It is the central organ of the Armed Forces Administration and oversees operational management of the armed forces under the Ministry of Defence of Ukraine.

The Chief of the General Staff of the Armed Forces of Ukraine is appointed by the President of Ukraine, who is the supreme commander-in-chief of the armed forces. On 28 March 2020 the position of Commander-in-Chief of the Armed Forces of Ukraine was separated from that of the Chief of the General Staff. The current Chief of the General Staff is Serhiy Shaptala, and the Commander-in-Chief is Valerii Zaluzhnyi.

The General Staff was created in 1991–92 on the basis of the Kyiv Military District headquarters of the former Soviet Armed Forces.

Organization
 Commander-in-Chief of the Armed Forces of Ukraine
 Chief of the General Staff of the Armed Forces of Ukraine
 Joint Operations Staff of the Armed Forces of Ukraine
 Directorate of Legal Support
 Department of the Chief Directorate of Intelligence
 Financial Directorate
 Office of assistants of the Chief of the General Staff
 Deputies of the Chief of the General Staff
 Chief Directorate of personnel management, Chief Directorate of moral and psychological support
 Chief Directorate of personnel (J-1)
 Chief Directorate of operations (J-3)
 Chief Directorate of logistics (J-4)
 Chief Directorate of defense and mobilization planning of the General Staff (J-5)
 Chief Directorate of communication and information systems of the General Staff (J-6)
 Chief Directorate of Armed Forces training (J-7)
 Chief Military Medical Directorate (J-8)
 Central Directorate of military service security
 Chief Command Center
 Directorate of special operations
 Chief Directorate of operational support
 Directorate of verification
 Central Directorate of information security and cryptology 
 Chief Directorate of military cooperation and peacekeeping operations
 Scientific Directorate of the General Staff
 Military Music Directorate
 Administration Directorate
 Chief Finance and Economical Directorate

Past directorates
 Assistants to the Chief of the General Staff
 Control and Oversight Directorate
 First Deputy Chief of the General Staff
 Deputy Chief of the General Staff
 Euro-Atlantic Integration Directorate
 Military Cooperation Directorate
 Garrison Service Directorate
 First Deputy Chief of the General Staff
 Deputy Chief of the General Staff
 Military scientific directorate
 Financial Directorate
 Main Financial-Economic Directorate (J-8)
 Deputy Chief of the General Staff
 Section for Transition to All-Volunteer Contract Service
 Military Symbols and Heraldry Section
 Main Personnel Directorate (J-1)
 Main Operations Directorate (J-3/7)
 Main Defence Planning Directorate (J-5)
 Legal Directorate

Members of General Staff

 Commander-in-Chief of the Armed Forces: General Valerii Zaluzhnyi (part of General Staff ex-officio)
 Chief of the General Staff: Lieutenant general Serhiy Shaptala
 Commander of the Ground Forces: Colonel General Oleksandr Syrskyi
 Commander of the Navy: Vice Admiral Oleksiy Neizhpapa
 Commander of the Air Force: Lieutenant General Mykola Oleschuk
 Commander of the Air Assault Forces: Major General Yevhen Mosiuk
 Commander of the Special Operations Forces: Major General Hryhoriy Halahan

Insignia

Sources

General Staff
Staff (military)

Presidency of Ukraine